The Legislative Assembly of Ulyanovsk Oblast is the regional parliament of Ulyanovsk Oblast, a federal subject of Russia. A total of 36 deputies are elected for five-year terms.

Elections

2018

List of chairmen

References 

Politics of Ulyanovsk Oblast
Ulyanovsk Oblast